Suicide Season is the second studio album by British rock band Bring Me the Horizon. It was released on 29 September 2008 in the United Kingdom and Europe through Visible Noise. The band signed a licensing deal with Epitaph Records on 11 September 2008, with the label releasing the album on 18 November 2008 in the United States.

The album shows a major change musically from their previous releases, abandoning their original deathcore sound. This would also be the last album to feature Curtis Ward on rhythm guitar. The band later released a two disc special edition of Suicide Season which features various musicians and producers remixing tracks off the album, entitled Suicide Season: Cut Up!;  this was released on 2 November 2009 in the United Kingdom through Visible Noise and on 12 April 2010 in the United States through Epitaph.

Suicide Season spawned three singles ("Chelsea Smile", "Diamonds Aren't Forever" and "The Sadness Will Never End"). The album debuted on the charts of five countries. Critically, the album received a mixed response. Though praised for the musical shift from the style of 2006's Count Your Blessings, the album was criticised for its song writing and musical aesthetics. The album has received more favourable retrospective analysis, notably surrounding Bring Me the Horizon's later critical acclaim.

Background and recording
After the release of band's first studio album 2006's Count Your Blessings, the band began experiencing an extremely hateful reaction from people to their music. They cited that very few publications featured them and in drummer Matt Nicholls' opinion, the band had gathered strong hatred from 'proper metalheads'. For example, when the band supported Killswitch Engage in 2007, the crowd began throwing bottles at the band before their set had even started. When preparing the music for Suicide Season, vocalist Oliver Sykes and lead guitarist Lee Malia agreed that this record would be the "make-or-break" factor for the band and that it had to be different from Count Your Blessings.

Suicide Season was written and recorded in Arboga, an isolated Swedish village with producer Fredrik Nordström. Lead vocalist Oliver Sykes described Arboga as "Nowheresville". Sykes considered the isolation Arboga provided as ideal in comparison to the constant activity in Birmingham, the recording location of their first album: "We recorded Count Your Blessings in the middle of Birmingham and it was very easy to get distracted. Arboga is a village with nothing in it apart from a tiny shop and that was it". During the initial recording of the album, Nordström initially was absent from working with the band, in Sykes perspective, he drew his own conclusion based on Count Your Blessings. However, he turned up midway through their recording process and was shocked by the music they had written, and from that point became more involved in the recording process. Nordström also taught the band some basic levels of recording and production so they could work through the night. By the end of the album, he said it was "one of the best CDs he's done in years".

The album cover features a girl (Stephanie Byrd) holding her intestines. Sykes explains this in an interview, stating: "The whole idea behind the cover is that the girl [on the cover] has her intestines out and it's about spilling your guts basically, and opening up to the world."

Whilst in Arboga, the band caused a controversy and lit an unlit, prepared bonfire in the middle of the forest. They were put in the local paper for destroying a pagan celebration.

The album features guest appearances from vocalist JJ Peters of Deez Nuts, Sam Carter of Architects and Luis Dubuc of The Secret Handshake.

Composition

Influences, style and themes
Suicide Season departs from Bring Me the Horizon's previous deathcore sound. The band was subsequently credited for adopting a more eclectic style and moving into a more "straight-up" metalcore sound. In an interview with Metal Hammer magazine, Sykes states that this album is "100% different" from Count Your Blessings. He also says: "We experimented a lot more I think, more with other styles of music we all enjoy, using different instruments and technology, by bringing a lot of digital stuff to the table. Every track is different." Because of this drastic change in sound from Count Your Blessings, they experienced a massive fanbase shift.

Sykes has stated that the band was better focused when in the studio, which made it easier for them to experiment with song writing and to expand their sound: "We didn't really have any other band we wanted to sound like or any other style. We just thought we'd try to do something different and see what comes out. And this is what came out."

The remix album Suicide Season: Cut Up! style has a range of different genres. Oliver Sykes in Interview states that "There's not a song on there that really sounds like the original. What's great though is the diversity of each song. There's dubstep to hip-hop, electro to drum and bass." The dubstep style of the record has been acknowledged in tracks from Tek-one and Skrillex while the hip-hop elements are found in Travis McCoy's remix of "Chelsea Smile". Benjamin Weinman's version of "No Need for Introductions..." is considerably the most unusual with its incorporation of industrial music.

Promotion and release
Visible Noise Records produced a site dedicated to the promotion of the album. It featured a clock counting down to 29 September (the album's release date), and a scroll-over page in which the visitor can reveal an image of the album's artwork.

The band also put a countdown to the release of the album in the United Kingdom. They also headlined in the United Kingdom, Europe, and the United States. The support acts included The Red Shore, Deez Nuts, The Secret Handshake, Dead Swans, The Legacy, Misery Signals, Johnny Truant, The Ghost Inside, and Confide. The album was released on 22 September through Visible Noise.

The first promotional video from Suicide Season was released on 12 August 2008 on the Visible Noise Myspace page, entitled "The Comedown". On 15 August, "Chelsea Smile" was released on the band's Myspace page.

The CD format of the album features a label stating the name of the album over the intestines on the cover, as it may be found offensive to some.

It was announced on 27 August 2009 that Bring Me the Horizon would be releasing a remixed version of Suicide Season, titled Suicide Season: Cut Up!, and it was released in the United Kingdom on 2 November 2009 and was later released in the United States on 12 April 2010. The origin of the album concept was that Oliver Sykes asked a friend to remix one of their songs, and the band was very pleased with the end result so the band decided to have all of Suicide Season remixed. Musicians and producers featured on the album include: Ben Weinman from The Dillinger Escape Plan, Skrillex, L'Amour La Morgue, KC Blitz, Utah Saints and Shawn "Clown" Crahan from Slipknot. Guitarist Lee Malia noted how they compiled the release to fulfil a contractual obligation to re-release the album.

In October 2011, it was awarded a gold certification from the Independent Music Companies Association which indicated sales of at least 75,000 copies throughout Europe.

Critical reception

Upon its release, the album was met with mixed reviews. While some music critics praised the album as being more musically diverse and powerful, others were not so pleased with the change in direction from the earlier deathcore sound of the band's previous album. Tom Forget of AllMusic wrote that the album is filled with "Intricately constructed and refreshingly unpredictable songs", citing Bring Me the Horizon as one of Britain's first metalcore bands to "make any waves." Phillip May praised the band's ditching of deathcore and new adoption of metalcore, writing on RockLouder that "One of Suicide Seasons greatest assets is its sense of menace. BMTH were always meant to be a terrifying prospect, but Count Your Blessings was so messy its attempts to be something dangerous were laughable. But here, by allowing layers and riffs time to breathe, efforts like the title track prove far more intimidating than any lightning-paced deathcore mush ever could." Ryan Williams of Thrash Hits gave the album a rating of 4.5 out of 6, writing that although some of Sykes' lyrics are "cheap", "It's easy to focus on the obvious and the silly but there are some seriously strong developments to BMTH's newly-matured music. The results are occasionally astounding."

A review on Sputnikmusic by Alex Silveri states that compared to Count Your Blessings, Suicide Season is "fresher and catchier", giving the album a 3 out of 5 rating. A review on IGN was positive, pointing out that although there are some weak songs on the album, it is "a great departure from their previous effort", and goes on to say "All in all this is an album to write home about."

A review of the album on Punknews.org was far more critical of the album, stating "there is "substance" here—there are guitar solos, tempo changes, gang vocals—but there isn't substance. There's no authenticity; it just seems like the songs were built from a collection of "brutal" ideas written on pieces of paper, put together in a hat, and splashed out on the floor." The album received a 1.5 out of 5 rating. A review on AbsolutePunk was also critical of the album, stating that while some songs were "heavy, but catchy" and "sounds like it would have a room full of people moshing until they drop", at some points it feels like the band is "half-arseing it", going on to say "Sometimes you wish they would throw in some thrash beats, and fast riffing. This can disappoint and I feel like a few solo's wouldn't go amiss." However, the reviewer concludes by saying "All in all, Suicide Season has impressed me. The boys from BMTH have come back and shown they aren't just a generic haircuts band."

Retrospect 

As Bring Me the Horizon received more recognition and acclaim, Suicide Season has been looked upon more fondly than when it was first released. In 2012, when Rock Sound inducted the record into their "Hall of Fame", the band members reflected on Suicide Season positively. Jamie Kossoff one of the remixers on the Cut Up! edition of the album noted that electronic and dance music remixes of heavy music was not common before the Cut Up! edition was released.

Accolades

Track listing

Personnel

Bring Me the Horizon
 Oliver Sykes – lead vocals, keyboards, programming
 Lee Malia – lead guitar
 Curtis Ward – rhythm guitar
 Matt Kean – bass guitar
 Matt Nicholls – drums, programming

Additional musicians
 JJ Peters of Deez Nuts – guest vocals on "Football Season Is Over"
 Sam Carter of Architects – guest clean vocals on "The Sadness Will Never End"
 The Secret Handshake – samples on "Chelsea Smile"

Additional personnel
 Fredrik Nordström and Henrik Udd – production, mixing
 Peter In De Betou – mastering at Tailormaid, Sweden

Charts

Certifications

References
Footnotes

Citations

Bibliography

External links

Suicide Season at YouTube (streamed copy where licensed)

Bring Me the Horizon albums
2008 albums
Albums recorded at Studio Fredman
Epitaph Records albums
Visible Noise albums
Albums with cover art by Sons of Nero
Albums produced by Fredrik Nordström